Joseph Bridger Cawthorn (March 29, 1868 – January 21, 1949) was an American stage and film comic actor.

Biography
Born on March 29, 1868, in New York City to a minstrel-show family, Cawthorn started out in show business as a child, debuting at Robinson's Music Hall in New York in 1872. He appeared in minstrel shows and vaudeville as a "Dutch" comic, employing a thick German dialect. He later worked in British music halls and American touring companies.

Cawthorn made his Broadway debut in 1895, 1897 or 1898, and embarked on a long career lasting over two decades. His first success was playing Boris in Victor Herbert's 1898 operetta The Fortune Teller. Other notable Broadway roles included the title character in Mother Goose (1903) and inventor Dr. Pill in the fantasy musical Little Nemo (1908). In the latter, he was called upon to ad lib to buy time during one performance while a problem backstage was dealt with. As "the scene called for him to describe imaginary animals he had hunted", he invented the "whiffenpoof" on the spot. Yale students in the audience appropriated it for the name of their glee club.

When his Broadway stardom waned, Cawthorn moved to Hollywood in 1927 and started a second prolific career, appearing in over 50 films, the last in 1942. He played Gremio in the first sound adaptation of The Taming of the Shrew in 1929, starring Mary Pickford and Douglas Fairbanks; Schultz in Gold Diggers of 1935; and Florenz Ziegfeld's father in The Great Ziegfeld (1936).

He was Queenie Vassar's third husband; they were married from 1902 to his death.

Cawthorn died on January 21, 1949, at age 80, in Beverly Hills, California. He is buried in Hollywood Forever cemetery.

Complete filmography

 The Secret Studio (1927) - Pa Merton
 Two Girls Wanted (1927) - Philip Hancock
 Very Confidential (1927) - Donald Allen
 Silk Legs (1927) - Ezra Fulton
 Hold 'Em Yale (1928) - Professor George Bradbury
 Speakeasy (1929) - Yokel
 Street Girl (1929) - Keppel - Cafe Owner
 The Taming of the Shrew (1929) - Gremio
 Jazz Heaven (1929) - Herman Kemple
 Dance Hall (1929) - Bremmer
 Dixiana (1930) - Cornelius Van Horn - Carl's Father
 The Princess and the Plumber (1930) - Merkl
 Kiki (1931) - Alfred Rapp
 A Tailor Made Man (1931) - Huber
 The Runaround (1931) - Lou
 Peach O'Reno (1931) - Joe Bruno
 White Zombie (1932) - Dr. Bruner
 Love Me Tonight (1932) - Dr. Armand de Fontinac
 They Call It Sin (1932) - Mr. Hollister
 Men Are Such Fools (1932) - Werner
 Whistling in the Dark (1933) - Otto Barfuss
 Grand Slam (1933) - Alex Alexandrovitch (uncredited)
 Blondie Johnson (1933) - Jewelry Store Manager
 Made on Broadway (1933) - Maxie Schultz
 Best of Enemies (1933) - Gus Schneider
 Broken Dreams (1933) - Pop
 Cold Turkey (1933 short)
 The Cat and the Fiddle (1934) - Rudy
 Lazy River (1934) - Mr. Julius Ambrose
 Glamour (1934) - Ibsen
 Twenty Million Sweethearts (1934) - Herbert Brokman
 The Last Gentleman (1934) - Dr. Wilson
 Housewife (1934) - Krueger
 The Human Side (1934) - Fritz Speigal
 Young and Beautiful (1934) - Herman Cline
 Music in the Air (1934) - Hans Uppman
 Sweet Adeline (1934) - Oscar Schmidt
 Maybe It's Love (1935) - Adolph Sr.
 Sweet Music (1935) - Sidney Selzer
 Naughty Marietta (1935) - Herr Schuman
 Gold Diggers of 1935 (1935) - Schultz
 Smart Girl (1935) - Karl Krausemeyer
 Bright Lights (1935) - Oscar Schlemmer
 Page Miss Glory (1935) - Mr.Freischutz
 Harmony Lane (1935) - Professor Henry Kleber
 Freshman Love (1936) - Wilson, Sr.
 The Great Ziegfeld (1936) - Dr. Ziegfeld
 Brides Are Like That (1936) - Fred Schultz
 One Rainy Afternoon (1936) - Monsieur Pelerin
 Hot Money (1936) - Max Dourfuss
 Crime Over London (1936) - Mr. Sherwood / Reilly
 Lillian Russell (1940) - Leopold Damrosch
 Scatterbrain (1940) - Nicholas Raptis
 So Ends Our Night (1941) - Leopold Potzloch
 The Postman Didn't Ring (1942) - Silas Harwood (final film role)

References

External links

1868 births
1949 deaths
Male actors from New York City
19th-century American male actors
20th-century American male actors
American male film actors
American male stage actors
Vaudeville performers
Victor Records artists